Mirabelle plum (Prunus domestica subsp. syriaca) is a cultivar group of plum trees of the genus Prunus. It is believed that the plum was cultivated from a wild fruit grown in Anatolia.

Description

The mirabelle is identified by its small, oval shape, smooth-textured flesh, and especially by its red, or dark yellow colour which becomes flecked in appearance. They are known for being sweet and full of flavour. The fruit is primarily used in fruit preserves and dessert pies, and its juice is commonly fermented for wine or distilled into plum brandy. Some 90% of mirabelle plums grown commercially are made into either jam (70%) or eau de vie (20%). The plums are also excellent when eaten fresh.

The mirabelle reaches maturity and is harvested from July to mid-September in the Northern Hemisphere. The traditional method of shaking the trees is now mechanized, but the principle remains the same: the ripe fruits are shaken loose and collected in a net under the tree.

Cultivars
The following cultivars are considered part of the Mirabelle cultivar group:
 Mirabelle de Nancy
 Mirabelle de Metz

Mirabelle de Lorraine

The mirabelle is a speciality of the French region of Lorraine, which has an ideal climate and soil composition for the cultivation of this fruit. This region produces 15,000 tons of mirabelle plums annually, which constitutes 80% of global commercial production.
 
There are two main cultivars grown for fruit production, derived from cherry plums grown in Nancy and Metz. The Metz type is smaller, less hard, and less sweet, and has no small red spots on the skin. It is very good for jam, while the Nancy type is better as fresh fruit as it is sweeter.

Since 1996 the mirabelle de Lorraine has been recognized and promoted by the EU as a high-quality regional product, with a Protected Geographical Indication (PGI). This label guarantees a minimum fruit size (22 mm) and sugar content, and can only be used in a specific geographical zone of production.

The city of Metz dedicates two weeks to the Mirabelle plum during the popular Mirabelle Festival held in August. During the festival, in addition to open markets selling fresh prunes, mirabelle tarts, and mirabelle liquor, there is live music, fireworks, parties, art exhibits, a parade with floral floats and competition, and the crowning of the Mirabelle Queen and a gala of celebration.

Mirabelle plums are extremely popular in Germany where they grow both wild and cultivated, primarily in the south and southwest.  Mirabelle plums are enjoyed fresh or as various kinds of mirabelle cakes, liquor, preserves, and canned fruit.

In Spain it grows in Galicia, in O Rosal, a valley in the south of the province of Pontevedra to which it was introduced in the mid-twentieth century by Xosé Sánchez García and where it has acclimated to perfection. In Galicia, it is consumed fresh, but it is also used to manufacture preserves and liqueurs. It is also naturalized in the Ebro Valley in parts of Zaragoza, Teruel, Lleida and Tarragona, and can be found near rivers, irrigation canals and road ditches. In Aragon mirabelle plums are called cascabeles.

In England, mirabelles grow both wild and cultivated in Essex, and there are yellow, orange and red varieties in Maylandsea and at Alresford in Hampshire.  There are also red, yellow and orange varieties that formed the boundary hedge to an Orchard in Sheringham Norfolk.  The orchard was developed into housing in the late 1960s so the hedge is thought be up to 100 years old.  The Metz variety grows wild in Suffolk at Leathes' Ham, near Oulton Broad. One tree can also be found growing wild in North West England in Liverpool, and several may be found in the Buckinghamshire town of Milton Keynes. Red and yellow varieties have also been found recently in an ancient hedgerow just outside Northampton. A lone tree found in a nature area in Hucknall, Nottinghamshire produced a massive crop in 2015. Several mirabelles have also been seen in East Ashling hedgerow fields near Chichester West Sussex. The mirabelle is also found in hedgerows in Sutton-on-Trent, Nottinghamshire and on the Millfied Golf Course, Lincolnshire.

They are likewise found in the Czech Republic, Hungary, Romania, Bosnia-Herzegovina, Poland, Slovakia and Slovenia both wild and cultivated, often at roadsides. In the United States, trees dating back to the 1940s are still producing fruit in residential neighborhoods in Tamalpais Valley, just north of San Francisco.

Appellation protection  
Import of mirabelles to the United States is generally restricted.

References

European Garden Flora; vol. IV; 1995.

Plum cultigens
Fruit trees